The Zadran ( dzadrāṇ; pronounced dzādroṇ in the Khost-Paktia dialect), also spelled Dzadran or Jadran, is a Pashtun tribe that inhabits the Loya Paktia region in southeastern Afghanistan (Khost, Paktia, and Paktika provinces) and parts of Waziristan in neighboring Pakistan. "Zadran: Pashtun tribe mainly residing in the “Zadran Arc” a 9-district area encompassing portions of the Khost, Paktya, and Paktika provinces."

The Zadran are a branch of the Karlani tribal confederacy. They are the largest Pashtun tribal group in Afghanistan's mountainous southeastern region, usually found in areas that are unsuitable for settled agricultural production. They have a reputation for militancy dating to the Soviet–Afghan War. Well-known Taliban fighter Jalaluddin Haqqani, who in later years headed the Haqqani network, is of the Zadran tribe himself, though he is recognized for ending the malik system by forcing Mohammad Omar Babrakzai to leave Paktia province. Babrakzai was the most powerful malik, or tribal chieftain, of the Zadran in the 1980s.

List of chieftains 

 Babrak Khan (unknown – )
 Mazrak Zadran ( – 11 January 1947)
 Abdulla Khan Jadran Yawan (as of 1969)
 Muhammad Umar Babrakzai (bef. 1980 – present)

It is unclear if Abdulla Khan Jadran Yawan is the immediate successor or predecessor of Mazrak Zadran and Muhammad Umar Babrakzai respectively, or if there were other chieftains between them.

Tribal tree 
The known tribal tree for the Zadran tribe is:

Moosa Khel was the father of three sons, Bakir Khel, Sounda Khel and Barkhudar Khel

Bakir Khel was the father of Noor Kalia Khel

Noor Kalia Khel was the father of Ismail Khel

Ismail Khel was the father of Jaan Muhammad Khel

Jaan Muhammad Khel was the father of two sons, Shah Muhammad Khan Zadran and Noor Muhammad Khan Zadran

Noor Muhammad Khan had five sons

1 Sadiq Hussain Khan Zadran

2 Ashiq Hussain Khan Zadran

3 Izhaar Hussain Khan Zadran

4 Dildaar Hussain Khan Zadran

5 Afzaal Hussain Khan Zadran

Afzaal Hussain Khan Zadran was the father of two sons

1 Iklaq Khan Zadran and 2 Umair Khan Zadran

Umair Khan Zadran was the father of Muhammad Khan Zadran

Notable persons 

 Said Akbar Babrak
 Mazrak Zadran
 Babrak Khan
 Saad Akbar Babrak
 Jalaluddin Haqqani
 Sirajuddin Haqqani
 Pacha Khan Zadran
 Najeebullah Zadran
 Shapoor Zadran
 Djelaludin Sharityar
 Musa Zadran
 Noor Ali Zadran
 Dawlat Zadran
 Ibrahim Zadran
 Mujeeb Zadran
 Sher Muhd Khan
  Hazrat Wali Zadran
  Izat khan Zadran
  Dr.ayub Zadran
  Rashid Saqeeb
  Alefkhan Zadran
  Ibrahim Zadran
  Yaqoob Zadran

See also
Zerok
Loya Paktia

References

External links 

Karlani Pashtun tribes
Ethnic groups in Khost Province
Ethnic groups in Paktia Province
Ethnic groups in Paktika Province